The Ligier JS5 was the first Formula One racing car made by Ligier. Designed by Gérard Ducarouge, it competed in the 1976 Formula One season, gaining 20 points and getting sixth place overall in the Constructor's Championship. The car also gave its driver Jacques Laffite and Ligier their first ever pole position at the 1976 Italian Grand Prix at Monza.

Background
Guy Ligier was a Frenchman that had become wealthy as a result of his construction company. Having participated briefly in Formula One as a driver in the 1960s, he founded a race car company in 1969. This made sportscars, including the JS2 which was raced at Le Mans in 1972. In late 1974, having secured backing from the French tobacco company SEITA, he recruited Gérard Ducarouge from Matra and set about preparing an entry for Formula One.

Design and development
Ducarouge, with assistance from Michel Beaujon, drew up a conventional monocoque with a long wheelbase that was to be designated the JS5. The JS5 was powered by the Matra MS73 V12 engine which has been used in sportscar racing for the previous few seasons. It was completed in October 1975 and exhibited at SEITA's main offices in Paris and the following month began testing at the Circuit Paul Ricard. To drive the car, Ligier contracted Jacques Laffite after briefly considering the experienced Jean-Pierre Beltoise.

The early races of the year were completed with the JS5 bearing a large airbox (earning the car the nickname of "Teapot") but changes in regulations following the 1976 Spanish Grand Prix saw this drastically downsized. The rear wing was also moved forward. The aerodynamics were improved at the time of building the second JS5 chassis and were substantially less curved than the first chassis built and raced.

Racing history
The JS5 made its debut at the opening race of the  season, the Brazilian Grand Prix, where Laffite qualified it in 11th place on the grid. He retired from the race itself, as he did from the following race in South Africa. At Long Beach, the third race of the year, from 12th on the grid, Laffite drove the JS5 to fourth place earning Ligier its first points. He scored his first podium in Belgium, where he finished in third place from sixth on the grid.

Laffite followed this performance up with another fourth at the Swedish Grand Prix. By the time of the Austrian race, a new chassis had been completed which Laffite used to great effect by finishing second from fifth on the grid. He was again on the podium in Italy where he finished third having qualified in pole position.

By the end of the season, Ligier, with 20 points, placed sixth in the Constructor's Championship. Laffite was seventh in the Driver's Championship.

Results
(key) (results in bold indicate pole position)

Notes
Footnotes

Citations

References

Ligier JS05
1976 Formula One season cars